Jazz Messengers '70 is a live album by drummer Art Blakey's Jazz Messengers recorded in Tokyo in 1970 and originally released on the Catalyst label.

Reception

Scott Yanow of Allmusic stated, "the quintet casts new light on these tunes, making them sound fresh and flexible. This unusual set is recommended to longtime followers of Art Blakey".

Track listing 
 "Moanin'" (Bobby Timmons) - 5:46   
 "Blues March" (Benny Golson) - 4:56   
 "Whisper Not" (Golson) - 6:34   
 "What the World Needs Now Is Peace and Love" (Carlos Garnett) - 6:48   
 "It's Only a Paper Moon" (Harold Arlen, Yip Harburg) - 10:14   
 "Politely" (Bill Hardman) - 5:22   
 "A Night in Tunisia" (Dizzy Gillespie) - 9:28

Personnel 
Art Blakey - drums
Bill Hardman - trumpet
Carlos Garnett - tenor saxophone
JoAnne Brackeen - piano
Jan Arnet - bass

References 

Art Blakey live albums
The Jazz Messengers live albums
1970 live albums
Catalyst Records (jazz) live albums